Hoxton is a station on the East London line in the London Borough of Hackney, Greater London. It is on the Kingsland Viaduct and served by London Overground. The station entrance is on Geffrye Street near Dunloe Street and Cremer Street, behind the Museum of the Home.

History

It was envisaged that the construction of the extension and the station itself would begin in 1996 and to be completed by 1998. The project was finally approved by the Government in 1996 but a lack of funding forced the project to be delayed in 1997.

The station is currently the only completely new station to be built along the route of the former Broad Street branch of the North London line under the East London line project, although it is located on the tracks leading to the former Shoreditch (Dunloe Street) Depot, which was closed in 1968.

At ground level at the entrance to the station is the First World War memorial commemorating fallen staff of the former North London Railway, which built the section of viaduct that is now the modern East London Line through Hoxton. Originally placed at now-closed Broad Street Station, it was moved to first Richmond and then in 2011 returned to be nearer its former location. It is listed with Grade II.

Layout
Hoxton station is a standard two-platform station with platforms situated on the Kingsland Viaduct. The platforms were originally built to accommodate a train of up to four cars but in 2015 the platforms were extended to accommodate five car electric trains of classes Class 378/1 (third rail shoes only) and 378/2 (third rail shoes and pantograph). The Ticket office and entrance concourse is located under the viaduct and access to each platform is provided by a lift and stairs.

Services and connections

All times below are correct as of the December 2010 timetables.

Mondays to Saturdays there is a service every 5–10 minutes throughout the day, while on Sundays before 13:00 there is a service every 5–9 minutes, changing to every 7–8 minutes until the end of service after that. Current off peak frequency in trains per hour is:

 16 tph to Dalston Junction, of which 8 continue to Highbury & Islington

4 tph to Crystal Palace
 4 tph to New Cross
 4 tph to West Croydon
 4 tph to Clapham Junction via Peckham Rye

London Buses routes 26, 55, 149, 242, 243, 394 and night routes N26, N55 and N242 serve the station.

References

External links

East London line

Railway stations in the London Borough of Hackney
Railway stations opened by Network Rail
Railway stations in Great Britain opened in 2010
Railway stations served by London Overground
London Overground Night Overground stations
Hoxton